Bodyrock is the fifth studio album by singer Lee Aaron, released on 13 September 1989 through Attic Records (Europe and North America) and Alfa Records (Japan). The album is Aaron's most successful and highest-charting release to date, reaching No. 24 on the Canadian albums chart and No. 36 on the German albums chart. Both of its singles also charted: "Whatcha Do to My Body" reached No. 25 on the Canadian singles chart and "Hands On" reached No. 38.

The music video for "Whatcha Do to My Body" was nominated for Video of the Year at the 1990 Juno Awards, while Bodyrock itself was nominated for Album of the Year and Rock Album of the Year in 1991. Furthermore, recording engineer Lenny DeRose received a nomination for Recording Engineer of the Year in 1990 for his work on the album. Bodyrock was certified Platinum on 18 December 1989.

Critical reception
Bodyrock was included on Chart magazine's list of "20 most influential Canadian albums of the '80s".

Track listing

Personnel
Lee Aaron – lead vocals, backing vocals
John Albani – guitar, background vocals, producer
Scott Humphrey – drum programming, bass (except track 12)
Matthew Gerrard – bass (track 12)
Phil Naro – background vocals
Chas Anthony – background vocals
Lenny DeRose – engineering, mixing
Darren Millar – engineering
Marty Ogden – mixing
Brian Allen – producer

Chart performance

Album

Singles

Awards

Certifications

References

External links
Bodyrock at leeaaron.com

Lee Aaron albums
1989 albums
Attic Records albums